Craggy Island is a rugged granite island, with an area of 38.88 ha, in south-eastern Australia.  It is part of Tasmania’s Bass Pyramid Group lying in northern Bass Strait between Flinders Island and the Kent Group.

History

Robinson reports there was a sealing camp on the island in 1831.

Fauna
Recorded breeding seabird and wader species include little penguin, short-tailed shearwater, fairy prion, common diving-petrel, Pacific gull and sooty oystercatcher.  The metallic skink is present.

See also

 List of islands of Tasmania

References

External links 
Information at Aussie Heritage
Information at Tasmanian State Library
Images of Craggy Island

Furneaux Group
Seal hunting